Dar al Athar al Islamiyyah is a cultural organization operating several cultural centers in Kuwait. 

The organization has a collection of more than 20,000 items of rare Islamic art. The collection belongs to Sheikh Nasser Sabah Al-Ahmed Al-Sabah and his wife Sheikha Hussa Sabah Al-Salem Al-Sabah, who personally oversees the Kuwait National Museum. Many items, especially those from the pre-Islamic period, are housed at Amricani Cultural Centre in Kuwait.

The collection includes "books, manuscripts, ceramics, glass, metal, precious stones and jewelled objects, architectural ornaments, textiles and carpets, coins and scientific instruments." 

The Dar al Athar al Islamiyyah cultural centres include education wings, conservation labs, and research libraries.

References

External links 
 
 The Al-Sabah Collection
Dar al Athar al Islamiyyah within Google Arts & Culture

1980 establishments in Kuwait
Museums established in 1980
Buildings and structures in Kuwait City
Museums in Kuwait
Cultural centers in Kuwait
Entertainment venues in Kuwait